Thomas Christopher Peter Alexander (born November 20, 1963 in Takoma Park, MD) is an American writer, broadcaster, composer, and voice actor.

He is a member of the Screen Actors Guild.

Tom was the Executive Editor and Co-Founder of the sports satire website The Sportsman's Daily, which was founded in 2006. The site delivered articles and radio content. It ceased operations in 2017.

Background 

Alexander was born into a Greek-American family and is an only child.

His parents, Peter (d. 1986) and Mary (née Kekeris d. 2014), were both children of Greek immigrants.

He was born in Takoma Park, Maryland, but was raised in Northeastern Pennsylvania near Wilkes-Barre.

His father and three uncles ran several single-screen art deco style movie theatres in the region that their father built shortly after emigrating from Mykines, Greece. Tom's grandfather (also Tom Alexander) changed his last name from Alexopoulos to Alexander when he arrived at Ellis Island near the turn of the 20th century. He was a pioneer in the cinema industry and even helped finance some silent comedies in the mid-1910s that were released through Paramount Pictures.

Alexander grew up and worked at the family's biggest theatre in Forty Fort, Pennsylvania, which closed on Leap Day, February 29, 1988, after over fifty consecutive years of operation.

Alexander graduated from Dallas Senior High School in Dallas, PA in 1981. He attended Misericordia University (then College Misericordia) in Dallas, PA before transferring and graduating from King's College in Wilkes-Barre, PA with a Bachelor of Arts degree in Mass Communications.

Career 

From the time he was a young boy, Alexander worked as a ticket taker, concession stand worker, projectionist, and assistant manager at his family's movie theatre in Forty Fort, PA. When the theatre closed, he pursued radio as a career. His first full-time radio job was as a nighttime board operator and host of "The Movie Guy," a call-in show about the latest movies, at WARD-AM in Pittston, Pennsylvania beginning in August 1989. During this time he also honed his comedy writing skills on the "Daniels and Webster" radio show at WEZX in Scranton. In 1992 he took a job as copywriter and voiceover artist at WKRZ-FM in Wilkes-Barre.

In November 1996, he accepted a job as Head Writer/Musical Director of “The Drive” with Scott Kaplan and Sid Rosenberg, a nationally syndicated sports-comedy hybrid radio show broadcast from CBS Interactive (then CBS Sportsline) in Fort Lauderdale, Florida. He wrote most of the show's sketches, voiced multiple characters, and wrote and performed the show's song parodies. He remained with the show for three years.

In 1999 he took the position of Creative Director at WAFN Radio in Miami.

In 2002, he formed Alexander Productions, where he focused on script writing for radio, TV, and film as well as voiceover work and musical imaging. In 2004, he co-hosted a baseball radio show called "Diamond Talk" with Marc James on WFLL in Miami. In 2005 and 2006 he was hired as the piano-playing sidekick to a talking beverage bottle in a series of popular TV and radio spots for Mike's Hard Lemonade. The commercials were produced in Miami, Austin, Mexico City, San Francisco, and the Playboy Mansion in Los Angeles.

In 2008, he co-wrote the frat-boy comedy Stonerville, starring Patrick Cavanaugh, Brian Guest, Pauly Shore, Phil Morris, and Leslie Nielsen. The film went into production the following year and was released in January 2011. It was Nielsen's final screen appearance. Alexander appeared in the film as a British sophisticate and as “Robert De Niro’s cousin” Giuseppe.

He has written or co-written several screenplays including Rehab in Vegas, and the sequel to Stonerville.

In September 2012, he revived his Silver Microphone award-winning radio essay series From the Bleachers for Yahoo! Sports Radio.

In 2014, he began voicing the character of Blog, the neurotic head of a caveman family, in the English-language version of the animated comedy series The Darwinners.

He is currently writing a book on his family's 80-year history in the cinema industry, which also touches on his personal memories in the business, called Making Concessions: One Family's Life From the Other Side of the Silver Screen.

In 2019, he began work on the screenplay for a horror project entitled, "Zathina". The project was co-written with his son, Peter, who is set to direct the film in 2023.

Music 

Alexander was interested in piano at an early age and took lessons beginning at age nine. He found formal music studies tedious and realized he was relying more on his ear. He soon quit formal studies. His father's youngest brother, Taki, a jazz pianist, was an early major influence, but Tom claims he is basically self-taught. After playing in rock and blues bands in high school and college, he discovered jazz, and in particular fusion and art rock. Being influenced especially by the music of Chick Corea, Herbie Hancock, Josef Zawinul, Pat Metheny, and John McLaughlin, Alexander began forming his own fusion groups by the mid 1980s and recorded several original compositions on public radio as well as performing them in live settings through the mid 1990s.

In 1993, he co-founded the fusion groups World Is and Marketplace with drummer and fellow broadcaster Andrew Morrell.

In 1995 he co-wrote the score for the motion picture Philly Flash.

As Musical Director of the nationally syndicated “The Drive” radio show for CBS Interactive (1996–99), he wrote the show's theme song as well as countless song parodies. In 1999, he composed the theme for Football Playbook for Ion (then PAX) Television.

In 2001, he self-produced a solo piano CD called What’s Ahead?  It was featured prominently during an interview on Weekend Edition Sunday with Liane Hansen on NPR Radio on Father's Day, June 17, of that year. On January 22, 2021, a 20th Anniversary Edition of What's Ahead? was released across multiple digital platforms.

In 2004, he produced the more fusion oriented Flying Against the Time Zones.

In 2005 and 2006, he co-composed and performed much of the music on a series of television and radio ads for Mike's Hard Lemonade. He also wrote incidental music for the film Stonerville (2011).

He composes and performs with his fusion group, Earth Code, which he co-founded in the early 2000s with drummer, Tommy G. Lee. The band functions primarily as a trio with keyboards, drums and electric bass. The group has had several bassists over the years including Yngwie Malmsteen's touring bassist, Emilio Martinez. Guitarists often join the group in live performances and on recordings. Earth Code's first album, Tones From the Middle Distance, was released on April 2, 2018. Earth Code's second album, Idiom, was released on February 24, 2023. 

His latest solo album, Dreams In Blue (Original Soundtrack Studio Recordings from the Films: The Centenarian, Walkin’ the Way & The Last Weekend) released in October 2020. The music was composed entirely to accompany the films of his son, writer/director Peter Alexander. The album features Emilio Martinez on bass and guitar. Martinez also engineered and co-produced the recording with Alexander. Vocalist Kayla Smith appears on several tracks as well as vocalist/guitarist, Lucas Blando.

Overbrook Avenue, primarily made up of original compositions, was released in December 2016. Alexander played piano and keyboards on the recording, and special guest John Fifield is featured on guitar. A solo project, "Cinemusique: A Tribute to 12 Great Film Directors" was released in December of 2021.

Personal life 

Alexander married Gwyn Wood on September 10, 1988. They have one son, Peter, who was born on March 9, 1997, and is a filmmaker. Besides performing with his musical groups, he enjoys watching professional baseball and basketball. He also enjoys swimming, travel, and Mediterranean-style cooking.

References

1963 births
Writers from Maryland
American broadcasters
21st-century American composers
American male voice actors
Living people
Male actors from Maryland